Chapara is a village in Srikakulam district of the Indian state of Andhra Pradesh. It is located in Meliaputti mandal of Palakonda revenue division.

Geography 
It has an average elevation of 74 meters (246 feet). River Mahendra tanaya flows besides the village.

Demographics 
 Indian census, the demographic details of Meliaputti mandal is as follows:
 Total Population: 	50,490	in 11,532 Households
 Male Population: 	24,947	and Female Population: 	25,543
 Children Under 6-years  of age: 7,044	(Boys – 3,560 and Girls – 3,484)
 Total Literates: 	22,766

References 

Villages in Srikakulam district
Mandal headquarters in Srikakulam district